Falla is a Cuban village and consejo popular ("people's council", i.e. hamlet) of the municipality of Chambas, in Ciego de Ávila Province. In 2011 it had a population of about 8,789.

History
Founded in 1912 as the hacienda Nauyús y Cacarratas, owned by Pepe Planas, a man linked to Falla-Gutiérrez sugar company. After his death (shot by unknown), the Laureano Falla-Gutiérrez Association, which would extend it for the delivery of land made by the President of the Republic, Alfredo Zayas, is in charge of the hacienda. The concession of the latifundium extended the sugarcane monoculture in the area and, with it, the development of the current urban settlement.

After the Cuban Revolution, and following the creation of "people's councils" (consejos populares), the one of Falla was named Enrique Varona after Enrique Varona González, a Cuban trade union leader and socialist killed in 1920.

Geography
Located on a rural plain, southwest of Laguna de Leche (9 km far) and south of the Bay of Buena Vista (28 km from Punta San Juan), Falla spans across the state highway "Circuito Norte" and the railway. The western old settlement develops around the sugar factory, the eastern new area grows mainly to the north of the train station.

The village is 15 km from Tamarindo, 17 from Chambas, 18 from Morón, 24 from Ciro Redondo, 28 from Florencia, 41 from Ciego de Ávila and 81 from Cayo Coco. Nearest settlements are the villages El Calvario (6 km west) and Ranchuelo (7 km east).

Economy
The main economic activity is represented by the sugar industry. The sugar refinery "Enrique Varona" (Central Azucarero Enrique Varona Gonzáles), founded in 1915 as Central Adelaida, is a large complex with its own industrial railway line.

Transport
Falla is crossed in the middle the state highway "Circuito Norte" (CN). It counts a railway station on the Santa Clara-Camajuaní-Morón-Nuevitas line, with local and long-distance trains, connecting the village with Havana too. Falla station is also the terminus of 3 minor branch lines: one to Kilo 9 and  Punta San Juan (Maxímo Gómez), another (closed) to Chicola (by the Laguna de Leche), and a third one (industrial) to Ciro Redondo, on the Morón-Ciego de Ávila line. This one serves the sugar refinery "Enrique Varona".

See also

Chambas Municipal Museum
Municipalities of Cuba
List of cities in Cuba

References

External links

Populated places in Ciego de Ávila Province
Populated places established in 1912